Upotipotpon is a rural area in Victoria, Australia,  north-east of the state capital, Melbourne, and  km north of Violet Town. The name may derive from the Aboriginal expression pootong pootong, meaning "plenty of grass", and was used for a pastoral property taken up in 1841 between the Broken River and Stony Creek.

A small town of the same name used to exist in the area. Between 1882 and 1888, four primary schools were opened in the district, all carrying the Upotipotpon name. They were closed between 1938 and 1951. A post office, Upotipotpon Station, opened around 1902. It was renamed Upotipotpon around 1907 and closed in 1913. In 1911 the population was 240 and in 1933 it was 131. Today, a handful of families remain on farms (including Redwood Farm) scattered around the area.

Upotipotpon is one of the home towns listed on the Australian War Memorial in London.

Upotipotpon is now a stronghold for woodland conservation in Victoria. The agricultural landscape of the area is changing, with olive and farm forestry plantations becoming prominent as well as a number of properties being managed for conservation. It has well-treed roadsides and large patches of woodland vegetation, and a large number of woodland birds.  The area has one of the few remaining large populations of grey-crowned babblers in the state.

References

Towns in Victoria (Australia)
Shire of Strathbogie